
Hansken (1630 – Florence, 9 November 1655) was a female elephant that became famous in early 17th-century Europe. She toured many countries, demonstrating circus tricks, and influenced many artists including Stefano della Bella, Theodoor van Thulden and notably, Rembrandt.

Hansken was born in what was then Ceylon and was brought to Holland in 1637 at the request of Prince Frederick Henry.  She was purchased by Cornelis van Groenevelt for 20,000 guilders, who transported her around Europe on tour. Her name is a Dutch diminutive form of the Tamil word aanai, meaning "elephant". Rembrandt saw her in Amsterdam in 1637, and made four sketches of her in chalk.

Hansken toured fairs in the Netherlands and Germany. She appeared in Hamburg in 1638, in Bremen in 1640, in Rotterdam in 1641, in Frankfurt in 1646 and 1647, and in Lüneburg in 1650. She was likely in Leipzig in 1649 and 1651.

In the 17th century, it was believed that elephants had very advanced intellectual abilities. Following Pliny, it was thought that the elephant was the nearest to man in intelligence, and that elephants could understand speech, follow orders, and had a sense of religion and conscience. Pliny even reports that an elephant had learned to write words in the Greek alphabet. Hansken did not live up to these expectations, but she could wave a flag, fire a pistol, strike a drum, hold out her front feet, pinch money from pockets, put on a hat, carry a bucket of water, and pick up coins from the ground.

In July 1651, Hansken travelled to Zürich, Solothurn, Bregenz and St. Gallen, and on to Rome. She visited Florence, where she was drawn by artist Stefano della Bella.  On the way back from Rome, the elephant died in the Piazza della Signoria, Florence. Della Bella also drew her corpse after her death on 9 November 1655.

The skeleton of Hansken is still preserved in Florence at Museo della Specola. The skin, which was mounted on a wooden support, is now lost.

See also
Cultural depictions of elephants
List of historical elephants
History of elephants in Europe
Hanno (elephant)

References

This article is based on a translation of the equivalent article of the German Wikipedia, dated 2006-07-25

Further reading
Stephan Oettermann: Die Schaulust am Elefanten. Eine Elephantographia Curiosa. Syndikat, Frankfurt am Main 1982. S. 44ff; S. 124-129    
Michiel Roscam Abbing: Rembrandt's Elephant. The story of Hansken. Leporello Uitgevers, Amsterdam 2006. 
Deitlef Heinkamp and Michiel Roscam Abbing: Epitaffio per un elefante morto nella Loggia dei Lanzi, in VV. AA., Diafane Passioni, avori barocchi dalle corti europee, Sillabe, Livorno 2013.

External links

Engraving at the Rijksmuseum

17th-century individual animals
1655 deaths
Individual elephants
Individual animals in the Netherlands
Individual animals in Germany
Individual animals in Switzerland
Individual animals in Italy
Former properties of the Dutch East India Company
Dutch Ceylon
Rembrandt